The Southington Center Historic District is a National Register of Historic Places district covering a major portion of the center of Southington, Connecticut. The area includes a considerable number of resources, many of which are buildings, commercial, governmental, religious and residential, but the list also includes monuments, and the town green. The district was added to the National Register in 1989.

Many of the buildings in the district date to Colonial times. Southington became a town in 1779, but European settlers first came to the area in 1698. Many of the commercial, religious and government buildings lie along Main or North Main, on either side of the town green. There are some residential buildings on the two main streets, but the majority of the residential buildings are on Vermont and Berlin streets, adjacent to Main Street.

Monuments

The district includes four monuments, each of which is located on the town green, in the center of town.
The monuments are:
 A Civil War monument
 A World War I monument
 A World War II- Korea - Vietnam monument
 A granite fountain commemorating Amon Bradley, a 19th-century industrialist.

Residences
One of the oldest residences in town is that of Jonathan Root, whose house was used both as a dwelling and a tavern. This building is within the district, but is also separately listed on the National Register of Historic Places.

The Cyrus C. Chamberlain House, at 114 Main Street, is an example of a residential building in the center of town. It was built in 1823, in the Federal style.

Commercial, religious and governmental

The Congregational Church, at 37 Main Street, was built between 1828 and 1832 in the Federal style. The Federal Post Office, at 125 Main street, dates to 1939, although it has an addition built in 1964. The style is Georgian Revival.

Gallery

See also
National Register of Historic Places listings in Southington, Connecticut

References

National Register of Historic Places in Hartford County, Connecticut
Historic districts in Hartford County, Connecticut
Southington, Connecticut
Historic districts on the National Register of Historic Places in Connecticut